Newtown Central was the name of a county electoral ward in the town of Newtown, Powys, Wales. It remains as a community ward to Newtown and Llanllwchaiarn Town Council.

Description
Newtown Central ward covered the area west of Newtown town centre and immediately south of the River Severn.

The ward elected two councillors to Montgomeryshire District Council  and Powys County Council, but since the May 1999 election it elected one county councillor to Powys County Council. 

Newtown Central is a community ward and is represented by three town councillors on Newtown and Llanllwchaiarn Town Council.

According to the 2011 UK Census the population of the ward was 3,278.

Effective from the 2022 local elections, Newtown Central was merged with Newtown South to become Newtown Central and South, which elected two councillors to Powys County Council.

County elections
At the May 2017 Powys County Council elections four of the five sitting councillors in Newtown and Llanllwchaiarn stood down, with Newtown Central being won from the Conservative Party by a Liberal Democrat, David Selby, bucking the county trend.

Since 1995 the ward has been represented by Plaid Cymru and Independent councillors, though in 2008 it was taken by the Conservatives (who retained the seat in 2012).

See also
 List of electoral wards in Powys

References

Newtown, Powys
Wards of Powys